The Minister-President of North Rhine-Westphalia, also referred to as Premier or Prime Minister, is the head of government of the German state of North Rhine-Westphalia (NRW). The position was created in 1946, when the British administration merge the Prussian province of Westphalia and the northern part of the Prussian province of the Rhine (North Rhine) were merged to form the state of North Rhine-Westphalia. In 1947 the state was expanded with including of the state of Lippe.

The current Minister-President is Hendrik Wüst, heading a coalition government between the Christian Democratic Union and the Free Democratic Party. Wüst succeeded Armin Laschet following his resignation in 2021.

The office of the Minister President is known as the State Chancellery, and is located in the capital of Düsseldorf, along with the rest of the cabinet departments.

Title 
The German title Ministerpräsident may be translated literally as Minister-President, although the state government sometimes uses the title Prime Minister in English.

Origin of the office 
After the Second World War, the Prussian province of Westphalia and the northern part of the Prussian province of the Rhine (North Rhine) were administered as part of the zone allocated to the British military administration and were merged to form the state of North Rhine-Westphalia. In 1947 the state was expanded with including of the state of Lippe. The British government began to back the advocates of a merger of the states.

List
Political Party:

See also

 North Rhine-Westphalia
 Politics of North Rhine-Westphalia
 Landtag of North Rhine-Westphalia

References

External links

 http://www.nrw.de/en/state-government/prime-minister/ 

!
North Rhine-Westphalia-related lists
North Rhine-Westphalia Minister-President